Sprokkelbosch is a former hamlet near Rosmalen, Netherlands. Sprokkelbosch was south of the Tilburg - Nijmegen railway and had its own railway station; its name was also Sprokkelbosch.

The road which led to Sprokkelbosch is now a cycling road in the urb Sparrenburg.

Populated places in North Brabant
's-Hertogenbosch